Ricardo Alberto Ledée (born November 22, 1973) is a former Major League Baseball outfielder who played for the New York Yankees, Cleveland Indians, Texas Rangers, Philadelphia Phillies, San Francisco Giants, Los Angeles Dodgers, and New York Mets in his decade-long professional career. He won two World Series championships with the Yankees in 1998 and 1999.

Professional career
The New York Yankees selected Ledée in the 16th round of the 1990 Major League Baseball draft. He didn't break into the Major Leagues until 1998, playing in 42 games with the Yankees. The left-handed outfielder reached base in eight consecutive plate appearances in the 1998 World Series and was part of the Yankees' championship teams in both 1998 and 1999.

In 2000, Ledée was batting only .241 for the Yankees when they traded him, along with pitchers Jake Westbrook and Zach Day, to the Cleveland Indians in exchange for David Justice. He played just 17 games for the Indians before they traded him to the Texas Rangers for first baseman David Segui. He finished the 2000 season with the Rangers and was a reserve for the club in 2001. He signed with the Philadelphia Phillies in 2002. On July 30, 2004, the Phillies traded him with Alfredo Simón to the San Francisco Giants for Félix Rodríguez. He signed with the Los Angeles Dodgers, and was claimed off of waivers by the New York Mets on August 8, 2006.

Ledée signed a minor league contract with the Oakland Athletics on February 2, 2007, and was invited to their spring training camp, but was released March 25. The Mets signed him to another minor league contract March 31. He was a starting outfielder for their triple-A, Pacific Coast League affiliate, New Orleans Zephyrs, when they recalled him to the Major League roster June 8. On July 8, he was designated for assignment.

Ledée retired from baseball on August 21, 2007.

Personal life
Ledée's late father, Toñito Ledée, was the lead singer of Papo Lucca's band, La Sonora Ponceña. Ledee appeared in the For Love of the Game as a member of the New York Yankees named Ruiz.
 
Ledée has three children.

References

External links

1973 births
Living people
Major League Baseball players from Puerto Rico
Major League Baseball outfielders
New York Yankees players
Cleveland Indians players
Texas Rangers players
Philadelphia Phillies players
San Francisco Giants players
Los Angeles Dodgers players
New York Mets players
Sportspeople from Ponce, Puerto Rico
Gulf Coast Yankees players
Oneonta Yankees players
Greensboro Bats players
Columbus Clippers players
Norwich Navigators players
Oklahoma RedHawks players
Jacksonville Suns players
Norfolk Tides players
New Orleans Zephyrs players
2006 World Baseball Classic players